Taha Baqir (born 1912 in Babylon, Ottoman Iraq – 28 February 1984) was an Iraqi Assyriologist, author, cuneiformist, linguist, historian, and former curator of the National Museum of Iraq.

Baqir is considered one of Iraq's most eminent archaeologists. Among the works he is remembered for are his Akkadian to Arabic translation of the Epic of Gilgamesh, his decipherment of Babylonian mathematical tablets, his Akkadian law code discoveries, and his excavations of ancient Babylonian and Sumerian sites; including the ancient Sumerian city of Shaduppum in Baghdad.

Baqir was proficient in the four historical Iraqi languages (Arabic, Aramaic, Akkadian, Sumerian), as well as English, French and German.

Career

Iraqi Department of Antiquities and Heritage
Technical expert 1938–1941.
Secretary of the Iraqi National Museum 1941–1953.
Associate Director of Antiquities 1953–1958.
Inspector General of Excavations 1958.
General Director of Antiquities 1958–1963.
Founder and editor of the journal Sumer 1945–1958.

In Libya
Consultant at the Libyan Department of Antiquities 1965–1970.
Professor at the University of Libya 1965–1970.

University of Baghdad
Taught ancient history and civilization at the Faculty of Education, University of Baghdad 1941–1960.
Taught ancient Iraqi languages (Sumerian and Akkadian) at the Department of Archaeology, Faculty of Arts 1951–1963.
Founding Board Member, University of Baghdad 1957–1958.
Board Member of the University of Baghdad 1960–1963.
Vice President of Baghdad University 1961–1963.
Professor at Baghdad University College of Arts 1970–1978.

Iraqi Academy of Sciences
Active member in the Iraqi Academy of Sciences 1971, 1979.
Vice President of the Iraqi Academy of Sciences 1983.

See also
Laws of Eshnunna
Shaduppum
Behnam Abu Alsoof
Donny George Youkhanna
Khazal Al-Majidi
Hormuz Rassam

References

1912 births
1984 deaths
Iraqi anthropologists
Iraqi archaeologists
Iraqi Assyriologists
20th-century Iraqi historians
Linguists from Iraq
Iraqi scholars
Iraqi translators
People from Hillah
American University of Beirut alumni
University of Baghdad alumni
University of Chicago alumni
Academic staff of the University of Baghdad
Academic staff of the University of Libya
20th-century translators
Iraqi curators
20th-century archaeologists
20th-century anthropologists
20th-century linguists

Assyriologists